Mariana D'Andrea (born 12 February 1998) is a Brazilian Paralympic powerlifter. She won the gold medal in the women's 73 kg event at the 2020 Summer Paralympics held in Tokyo, Japan. She is the first competitor representing Brazil to win a gold medal in powerlifting at the Paralympics. A few months later, she won the silver medal in her event at the 2021 World Para Powerlifting Championships held in Tbilisi, Georgia.

Career 

She competed in the women's 61 kg event at the 2016 Summer Paralympics held in Rio de Janeiro, Brazil. She did not register a successful lift at this event. She also competed in the women's 61 kg event at the 2017 World Para Powerlifting Championships held in Mexico City, Mexico without registering a successful lift.

At the 2019 World Para Powerlifting Championships held in Nur-Sultan, Kazakhstan, she won the silver medal in the mixed team event. At the 2019 Parapan American Games held in Lima, Peru, she won the gold medal in the women's 61 and 67 kg (combined) event. She also set a new Parapan American record of 114.35 kg.

Results

References

External links
 

Living people
1998 births
People from Itu, São Paulo
Female powerlifters
Paralympic powerlifters of Brazil
Powerlifters at the 2016 Summer Paralympics
Powerlifters at the 2020 Summer Paralympics
Brazilian powerlifters
Medalists at the 2020 Summer Paralympics
Paralympic gold medalists for Brazil
Paralympic medalists in powerlifting
Medalists at the 2019 Parapan American Games
Sportspeople from São Paulo (state)
21st-century Brazilian women